Joseph Patrick McFadden (May 22, 1947 – May 2, 2013) was an American prelate of the Roman Catholic Church. Formerly an auxiliary bishop of the Archdiocese of Philadelphia, he was installed as Bishop of Harrisburg on August 18, 2010. He served in that position until his death in 2013.

Early life and education
Joseph McFadden was born in West Philadelphia, Pennsylvania, to Thomas and Ellen (née Griffin) McFadden. His parents were Irish immigrants, and one of his sisters is a member of the Sisters Servants of the Immaculate Heart of Mary, Immaculata, PA. He received his early education at the parochial school of Our Lady of Lourdes Church in Overbrook, and attended St. Thomas More High School for Boys in Philadelphia from 1961 to 1965. At St. Thomas, he was a member of the National Honor Society, a player on the varsity basketball team, and the class valedictorian.

McFadden then attended St. Joseph's University, where he earned a Bachelor of Science degree in politics in 1969. He played on the freshmen basketball team at St. Joseph's, and also coached at St. Thomas More High School and West Catholic Boys High School. Following his graduation from St. Joseph's, he joined the faculty of West Catholic Boys High School, where he taught social studies. In addition to his teaching duties, he coached the junior varsity basketball team and served as the school's athletic director.

In 1976, McFadden decided to study for the priesthood, a vocation he had considered "through high school and when [he] went to college." That year he entered St. Charles Borromeo Seminary in Overbrook, where he earned a Master of Divinity degree summa cum laude.

Priesthood
On May 16, 1981, McFadden was ordained a priest by Cardinal John Krol at the Cathedral Basilica of SS. Peter and Paul. His first assignment was as a parochial vicar at St. Laurence Church in Highland Park, where he remained for one year. From 1982 to 1993, he served as administrative secretary to Cardinal Krol. He was named an Honorary Prelate of His Holiness on May 29, 1991.

It was during McFadden's service as a secretary to Cardinal Krol that Krol is believed to have excused and enabled the sexual abuse of hundreds of children within the Philadelphia Archdiocese.

In 1993, McFadden became the first president of Cardinal O'Hara High School in Springfield. During his eight-year tenure, he increased the school's enrollment from 1,540 students to 2,000 students, and initiated the "Laptops for Learning" program. From 2001 to 2004, he served as pastor of St. Joseph's Church in Downingtown. In addition to his academic and pastoral duties, he served as chaplain to the Serra Club (1987–2001) and the Ancient Order of Hibernians (1986–95), spiritual director of St. Charles Borromeo Seminary, and director of the archdiocesan pilgrimages to the National Shrine of the Immaculate Conception in Washington, D.C.

Episcopacy

Philadelphia
On June 28, 2004, McFadden was appointed auxiliary bishop of the Archdiocese of Philadelphia and titular bishop of Horreomargum by Pope John Paul II. He received his episcopal consecration on the following July 28 from Cardinal Justin Francis Rigali, with Bishops Robert P. Maginnis and Michael Francis Burbidge serving as co-consecrators, at the Cathedral Basilica of SS. Peter and Paul. He selected as his episcopal motto: "Mary the Model - Jesus the Center".

Later that year, McFadden expressed his opposition to the holding of a gay rights event at his alma mater of Saint Joseph's University, saying, "While the Church asks that we recognize the unique dignity of every human person, it does not mean supporting a lifestyle that is contrary to the natural law". He was considered one of the likely candidates to succeed Donald Wuerl as Bishop of Pittsburgh following the latter's promotion to Archbishop of Washington.

As an auxiliary bishop, McFadden headed the Secretariat of Catholic Education in the archdiocesan curia. As a member of the United States Conference of Catholic Bishops, he served on the Committee on Catholic Education and the Task Force on Faith Formation and Sacramental Practice.
Bishop McFadden  played a pivotal role in closing both Northeast Catholic High School for boys and Cardinal Dougherty High School.

Harrisburg
On June 22, 2010, McFadden was appointed the tenth Bishop of Harrisburg by Pope Benedict XVI. His installation took place on August 18, 2010.

Bishop McFadden died suddenly in Philadelphia on May 2, 2013 while attending a meeting of the Catholic bishops of Pennsylvania.

Removal of name in Diocese of Harrisburg
On August 1, 2018, Bishop Ronald Gainer, McFadden's successor as bishop of Harrisburg, announced that the names of every bishop of Harrisburg from 1947 onward—including McFadden's -- will be removed from any building or room in the diocese named in their honor, due to their failure to protect victims from abuse.

References

External links

Office of Bishop McFadden
Cardinal Rigali's Homily at McFadden's Consecration

1947 births
2013 deaths
Roman Catholic bishops of Harrisburg
21st-century Roman Catholic bishops in the United States
Clergy from Philadelphia
Roman Catholic Archdiocese of Philadelphia
Saint Joseph's University alumni
St. Charles Borromeo Seminary alumni